George Allman (23 July 1930 – September 2016) was an English footballer who played as a forward. He made appearances in the Football League for Stockport County and Chester.

Playing career
Allman began his career with his home club of Stockport County, whom he joined in 1950. After two years at Edgeley Park, he moved to Holywell Town before returning to the professional ranks with Chester in the summer of 1955.

He spent two years at Seaman Road but was one of several departures at the end of 1956–57, along with players such as Jack Haines, Bernard Hackett and Jim Collins. He moved to Ashton United and later played for Mossley.

Bibliography

References

1930 births
Footballers from Stockport
2016 deaths
English footballers
Association football forwards
Stockport County F.C. players
Holywell Town F.C. players
Chester City F.C. players
Ashton United F.C. players
Mossley A.F.C. players
English Football League players